David Le Chaine Hollister (born August 17, 1968) is an American R&B singer who found fame during the 1990s as one quarter of the R&B quartet Blackstreet, before going on to have a solo career. Hollister is best known for his 2000 gold-certified album Chicago '85... The Movie, which included the singles "One Woman Man" and "Take Care of Home". He was also featured on Tupac Shakur's hit singles "Brenda's Got a Baby" and "Keep Ya Head Up". He was a member of the band, United Tenors

Discography

Studio albums

Collaboration albums

Compilation albums

Singles

References

External links

 Publicist: Rashonna Moore

Living people
American contemporary R&B singers
Blackstreet members
Singers from Chicago
1968 births
21st-century African-American male singers
20th-century African-American male singers